Alexey Pivovarov (Russian: Алексей Пивоваров, born June 12, 1974, in Moscow, USSR) is a Media manager, Journalist, documentary film director, and author of the YouTube Channel Redakciya.  In 2020, the GQ magazine named Pivovarov its Person of the Year and one of the most influential Russian-speaking journalists and YouTube creators.

In June 2022, the Russian Ministry of Justice added Alexey Pivovarov to the 'foreign agents list.' Being added to the list, a distinction that president Vladimir Putin's regime first launched against organizations and extended to individuals results in numerous legal and financial restrictions, according to The Art Newspaper.

Pivovarov's YouTube channel Redakciya (Rus: Редакция, Eng: The Editorial Office), launched in 2019. As of January 2023, it has over 3.6 million subscribers and close to one billion views.

Life and career

Alexey Pivovarov started his career at the age of 14 as a correspondent for the kids' radio station "Pioneers' dawn" (Rus "Пионерская Зорька") at the Vsesoyuznoye radio (United Soviet Radio, rus). During his college years, he worked as a host at Radio Maximum.

After graduating from the M. V. Lomonosov Moscow State University (MSU), Pivovarov worked as a TV reporter,  news anchor, and, later, a film producer at the first independent TV channel in Russia - the NTV. Pivovarovs most prominent work was alongside a famous Russian journalist Leonid Parfyonov in his non-political show Namedni (Nowadays, rus). This program was considered a golden standard of Russian journalism and best practices. It was awarded the prestigious TEFI award numerous times, including a personal TEFI for Pivovarov in 2004 for his special report 'Blood and milk' about the bankruptcy of an Italian dairy and food corporation, Parmalat.

Starting in February 2003, Pivovarov anchored evening news but was suspended from the air for a sarcastic comment on air about his ex-colleague's sacking. Pivovarov told the audience that Leonid Parfyonov had proved it "might be better to write than to talk in Russia."  He was later reinstated and anchored a nightly news digest, "Today," and also produced and starred in various infotainment shows, including "The Aviators" about aviation [6]  (Rus, "Авиаторы," NTV, 2006-2011) 

In 2011, the news agency Reuters called Pivovarov "an unlikely opposition hero"    after Kommersant reported that Pivovarov allegedly refused to ancho the news on December 8, 2011, if he could not report on the ongoing protests in Moscow, which were being ignored by the state-controlled media. The next day, NTV covered the demonstrations in the Evening news, and all other channels followed suit.

In 2013, Pivovarov left NTV to lead CTC Media and Transmedia Projects. Under his leadership, CTC Media grew its share in the younger demographic viewership, in part thanks to new TV series like The Junior Team (Russian: Молодёжка) and other highly rated TV shows.

In 2016, Pivovarov resigned from CTC Media, saying he "has done as much as possible" to improve the channel's ratings.  Later that year Pivovarov was appointed an Executive Producer and Editor-in-Chief of RTVi, the only independent global Russian-speaking TV channel with HQ in New York, NY. Under his leadership, RTVi has undergone a massive digital transformation into a modern multimedia organization, expanding its presence to all social media and mobile apps. Pivovarov left RTVi in June 2020 to dedicate more time and energy to his other projects.

YouTube Channel Redakciya 

Pivovarov launched its YouTube channel Redakciya (Rus: Редакция, Eng: The Editorial Office) in 2019 and a year later left RTVi to concentrate on his YT projects.

The first episode of Redakciya featured Sergey Shnurov and Volodymir Zelensky.  Redakciya covers many topics, from politics and current events to history, crime, personal development, and self-improvement. In addition to hourlong stories, Redakciya publishes shorter Special Reports on Tuesdays and a weekly news roundup on Sundays. With his unique perspective and engaging style, Pivovarov has become a respected and influential voice in the global Russian-speaking community. Pivovarov was named one of the 100 Most Creative Russians. Part of the content is translated into English and available in a separate English Subbed playlist.

Personal life 

Pivovarov is married to a journalist Anna Schneider and has a son named Ivan.

Honors and awards 

 2005 TEFI award for his special report on the Parmalat Bankurptcy  
 2007 The Medal of the Order "For Merit to the Fatherland II class civilian division for the hard work and ‘contributions to the National TV development 
 2008 Russian Federation Presidential Certificate of Gratitude for the active social work targeted at civilian development of the Russian Federation
 2009 NIKA Award for documentary "Rzhev. The Unknown Zhukov’s Battle."
 2010 Person of the year by the GQ Russia, 'A TV Personallity', GQ magazine  
 2019 Silver Play Button for achieving first 100,000 viewers
 2020 Gold Play Button for one million viewers
 2020 Person of the year by the GQ Russia, recognized for taking journalist investigations on YouTube to a new level by covering the COVID pandemic in Dagestan and the Norilsk oil spill disaster.
 2019 & 2020 Redkollegiya Award for a documentary about the 2016 Tu-154 crash in Sochi; and for the documentary about Covid-19 pandemic in Dagestan.

Documentaries and other notable work 

Pivovarov's works as director and producer include an Award-winning documentary 'The Term" about the Russian opposition's reaction and protests to Vladimir Putin's third presidential term, "Bread for Stalin" about the Dekulakization -the Soviet campaign of political repressions of millions of kulaks (prosperous peasants) and their families; and also a five-part docu-series about World War II. Based on thorough research, newly released historical documents, and interviews with experts and surviving witnesses, each film sheds new light on events of the recent past, deviating significantly from the version imposed by official soviet historiography. One of the films, Rzhev: General Zhukov's Unknown Battle, was awarded a special prize at the 2009 NIKA Ceremony (dabbed the Russian Oscars). In 2011 Aleksei participated in a joint Russian-German documentary project about the events leading up to World War II, acting as producer and one of the hosts.

 2010 — My Sin (fiction, NTV)
 2010 — Master (fiction, NTV)
 2010-2011 — Dark Materials (documentary, head of the production, NTV)
 2011 — Anastasiya Aid Center (producer, NTV)
 2011 — Second Strike. Loyal Army Of Vlasov (docu-fiction, NTV)
 2011-2012 — June 22. Dramatic Decisions (docu-fiction, NTV)
 2011 — USSR. The Fall Of The Empire (documentary, seven episodes, NTV)
 2011 — Yeltsin. Three Days In August (fiction, NTV)
 2012 — A White Man (fiction, four episodes, NTV)
 2012 — Patriotic. Great. (docu-fiction, NTV)
 2012 — Bread For Stalin. Dekulakized Stories (docu-fiction, NTV)
 2012 — Lokomotiv. Ascending Team (documentary, NTV)
 2012 — October 1917. Why Bolsheviki Got The Power (documentary, NTV)
 2012 — 6 sense (fiction, 16 episodes, NTV)
 2012-2014 — Srok (Term) co-authored with Pavel Kostomarov and Alexander Rastorguev 
 2013 — Egor Gaidar. The Death Of The Empire (documentary, NTV)
 2014 — Resort Police (fiction, 20 episodes, NTV)
 2015 — Prank (fiction, four episodes, NTV)
 2015 — Meteor (fiction, eight episodes, NTV)
 2016 — Red Easter (documentary, co-authored with Olga Belova, NTV)
 2016 — 90s. The Cost. (docu-fiction, NTV)
 2016 — Rasputin. The Investigation (docu-fiction, NTV)
 2016 — 11 Great Che's (documentary, 11 episodes, in August 2017, only one episode was released)
 2019 — How The First Rebel Lived And Died (YouTube film of Redaktsiya dedicated to Boris Nemtsov's death anniversary)
 2019 — Unconvenient Truth About Kursk Submarine (YouTube film of Redaktsiya)
 2019 — Tu-154 Catastrophe — Why Doctor Liza And Alexandrov's Choir Died? (YouTube film of Redaktsiya)
 2020 — Redaktsiya About Terrorist Attacks Which Started The Putin's Era (documentary about house explosions in 1999)
 2021 — How Teleconference USSR-USA Finished The Cold War (YouTube film of Redaktsiya about Vladimir Pozner’s and Phil Donahue teleconference)
 2021 — Incredible Story of Yuri Knozorov Who Deciphered Maya Mystery (YouTube film of Redaktsiya)

References

External links 
 Archived - Alexey Pivovarov Official website

Living people
Russian television journalists
1974 births
Writers from Moscow
Russian YouTubers
Russian journalists
Russian documentary filmmakers
Russian activists against the 2022 Russian invasion of Ukraine
Redkollegia award winners
People listed in Russia as media foreign agents